The  was an infantry division of the Imperial Japanese Army. It was formed 28 February 1945 in Fujisawa as a square division. It was a part of the 16 simultaneously created divisions batch numbering from 140th to 160th.

Action

The 140th division was tasked with the  fortification and the defence of the Shōnan coastal area. 401st infantry regiment was stationed at Mount Kamakura, 402nd - in Hachiōji, 403rd - in Fujisawa, 404th - in Goshomimura (now Fujisawa). 404th infantry regiment was severely understrength. The division stayed in the area until the surrender of Japan without seeing an actual combat.

See also
 List of Japanese Infantry Divisions

Notes and references
This article incorporates material from Japanese Wikipedia page 第140師団 (日本軍), accessed 12 July 2016
 Madej, W. Victor, Japanese Armed Forces Order of Battle, 1937–1945 [2 vols], Allentown, PA: 1981.

Japanese World War II divisions
Infantry divisions of Japan
Military units and formations established in 1945
Military units and formations disestablished in 1945
1945 establishments in Japan
1945 disestablishments in Japan